Miepoll is a locality in Victoria, Australia.

The place's name is derived from a local policeman's wife (My Poll).

References

Towns in Victoria (Australia)
Shire of Strathbogie